Number[s] is the debut album by American metalcore band, Woe, Is Me, released on August 30, 2010 through Rise Records and its imprint division, Velocity. A re-release of the record was released on July 16, 2012 with Andrew Paiano and Hance Alligood due to the departure of Tim Sherrill and Tyler Carter. It was the only album to feature the original line-up after conflicts within the band. Number[s] was produced by Cameron Mizell in his Orlando, Florida hometown. The sole guest vocalist on the album is Jonny Craig.

Release
Upon the release of Number[s], it charted at number 16 on Billboards Top Heatseekers chart, selling 1,700 copies in its first week. Two songs were released before the album itself: "[&] Delinquents" on July 29, 2010, and "Mannequin Religion" on August 20, 2010. The demo versions of three songs, "Hell, or High Water", "If Not, for Ourselves", and "I." had also been previously released.

Deluxe Edition

A re-issue of the album released July 17, 2012 featured songs with new vocalist Hance Alligood, who replaced Tyler Carter, and new guitarist Andrew Paiano. New vocalist Doriano Magliano, who replaced Michael Bohn, and new bassist Brian Medley were in the band at the time of the Deluxe Edition's release but do not appear on any of the recordings. Doriano and Brian would make their recording debut with the band on the follow-up Genesis (Woe, Is Me album).

All tracks that saw prior releases, both from the original album and the two newer singles from 2011, have been slightly changed on this release. This is made most evident by many differences heard in the beginning and ending of songs - largely re-arranging how the tracks bleed into each other.

Reception 

The album gained mixed to positive reception from critics, with Lexington Music Press saying that it "certainly gets better and better as it plays through and tries more out with its formula." However, they said that the during the first half of the album, "several songs share the same basic formula, keeping them from reaching the potential heights they could." The apparent stand out song was "Hell, or High Water", as they said it included "stand out and memorable moments, such as the hauntingly beautiful bridge (though the breakdown that follows is definitely noteworthy  as well)." The review closed positively, saying that Number[s] was "quite an explosive debut that will surely help Woe, Is Me rise the ranks quickly."

Max Grundström of Corezine also gave the album a highly praising review, saying that he was "expecting Woe, Is Me to be another run-of-the-mill, whiny post-hardcore band", but that his "mind was blown when [he] started listening to the intro." He said that they "mix catchy verses and bridges with bone crushing breakdowns, and even though it’s often encountered in modern metalcore/post-hardcore, Woe, Is Me succeed in keeping it fresh." He essentially closes the review with: "In a sea with similar acts Woe, Is Me somewhat drift with the other debris, but still manages to stay afloat."

Ryan Gardner, a writer at AbsolutePunk, gave the album a mostly positive review, saying that "Number[s] effectively combines elements found in bands such as labelmates In Fear and Faith and even Emarosa in the clean singing department; the clean vocals are spot on, the screams well placed (for the most part), and the musicianship is definitely there." He used tracks "[&] Delinquents" and "Keep Your Enemies Close" to state that "Michael Bohn can surely scream", and said that he believed "I" "switches back and forth from Woe, Is Me's heaviest material to their most melodic, featuring some of the best lyrics on Number[s]." He closed the review with

Track listing

Personnel 

Woe, Is Me line-up on standard issue
Tyler Carter – clean vocals
Michael Bohn – screamed vocals
Tim Sherrill – lead guitar
Kevin Hanson – rhythm guitar
Cory Ferris – bass guitar
Ben Ferris – keyboards, growled vocals
Austin Thornton – drums, programming

Woe, Is Me line-up on re-issue
Hance Alligood – clean vocals (tracks 1, 3, 6)
Tyler Carter – clean vocals (tracks 2, 4, 5, 7–16)
Michael Bohn – screamed vocals
Andrew Paiano – lead guitar (tracks 1-4, 6)
Geoffrey Higgins - lead guitar (track 5)
Kevin Hanson – rhythm guitar
Cory Ferris – bass guitar
Ben Ferris – keyboards, growled vocals
Austin Thornton – drums, programming

Additional musicians
Jonny Craig – additional vocals on tracks 8 and 10 (tracks 14 and 16 on re-issue)
Caleb Shomo – remixes on tracks 2 and 4 (re-issue)

Production
 Produced by Camerom Mizell @ Chango Studios
 Mastering by Joey Sturgis @ Foundation Studios
 Produced by Caleb Shomo (reissue tracks 1 and 3)

References 

2010 debut albums
Woe, Is Me albums
Rise Records albums
Albums produced by Cameron Mizell